Kaavalan is a 2011 Indian Tamil-language romantic action film written and directed by Siddique. A remake of the Malayalam film Bodyguard,  the film stars Vijay, Asin and Mithra Kurian with Rajkiran, Roja Selvamani and Vadivelu in supporting roles. The story revolves around Meera, who develops feelings in her bodyguard Bhoominathan and begins calling him as an anonymous caller named Ammukutty. The musical score is composed by Vidyasagar, and cinematography is handled by N. K. Ekambaram.

The film's principal shoot commenced in April 2010 and it was completed by November.

Originally, it was scheduled to release on 17 December 2010, but the release was postponed to 14 January 2011. The film was selected to be screened at the Shanghai International Film Festival and received positive reviews from critics who praised the cast performances (Vijay, Asin and Vadivelu), humour and action sequences. The film became a commercial success by grossing 102 crore worldwide.  It also marked Asin's last Tamil film of her entire film career before marriage.

Plot
Bhoominathan idolises Muthuramalingam, a rich powerful landlord in Semmanur. At the request of his parents, Bhoomi accepts to work for Muthuramalingam as his bodyguard. Muthuramalingam's rival is baying for his blood as his daughter committed suicide, as Muthuramalingam's son rejected her proposal. While Bhoomi protects Muthuramalingam, his rival threatens the life of his daughter Meera. No one accepts Bhoomi as he had attacked Meera's brother, thus getting him fired from the job, but Bhoomi saves Muthuramalingam from an attack and finally regains his job. Bhoomi is sent to college along with Meera and her friend Madhu to protect them from the threat. 

Bhoomi joins the same class where Meera studies, as he has previously discontinued his education. Meera does not like Bhoomi following her as a bodyguard, and plans to divert him. Meera calls Bhoomi over his mobile phone from a private number and introduces herself as Ammukutty. Initially, Bhoomi hates the mobile call as it will disturb him, but later develops a liking towards Ammukutty and slowly love blossoms for Bhoomi without knowing that it is Meera herself. He saves Meera from an attack from Muthuramalingam's rival. At one point, Meera too feels herself develop liking towards Bhoomi and expresses her desire to meet him in person without revealing her identity. Due to circumstances, they are not able to accomplish this, and she decides to elope with Bhoomi for which he agrees. 

However, Muthuramalingam learns that Bhoomi and Meera are going to run away and sends his men to stop him. Bhoomi thrashes them up easily but Muthuramalingam thrashes Bhoomi. Meera overhears her father's plans and decides to save Bhoomi by lying that he is in love with some other girl and has planned to elope with her. Muthuramalingam spares Bhoomi, believing that Meera is not his lover, but sends his men to the railway station to find out Bhoomi's lover. He also instructs that Bhoomi should be killed if there is no one in the railway station. In a desperate attempt to save Bhoomi, Meera comes up with a plan and requests Madhu to go to the railway station and pretend to be Ammukutty, so that Muthuramalingam's men will spare Bhoomi believing Madhu to be his lover. 

Meera also gives a mobile phone to Madhu and informs to give it to Bhoomi when she meets him (as Bhoomi's phone is broken) so that she can reveal the truth to Bhoomi. Madhu agrees and leaves to the station. At the station, Bhoomi gets surprised seeing Madhu in the station and believes that it is Madhu, who was pretending as Ammukutty so far and hugs her. Muthuramalingam's men see this and leave the place, believing that Meera is not Bhoomi's lover. Suddenly, Madhu gets a call in the mobile given by Meera. Madhu understands that the call is from Meera and she wants to speak to Bhoomi. However, Madhu throws away the phone from train, following which it is revealed that Madhu also likes Bhoomi, and she decides to marry him by betraying Meera. 

10 years later: Bhoomi is now a high-ranking I.F.S. officer, who returns to Muthuramalingam's village for a short vacation before leaving to Australia, along with his son Sidharth. Muthuramalingam's condition is ill and Madhu had died a few years back due to some medical ailments, but she has written all the truth in a diary and gives it to Sidharth to read it after her death. Sidharth has learnt all the truth. Madhu has also mentioned in the diary that this truth should never be disclosed to Bhoomi. Meera stays with her father, and Bhoomi gets shocked to know that Meera still remains unmarried. 

When Bhoomi and Sidharth are about to return home, Sidharth asks Meera to come with them and expresses his wish to call her as his mother. Bhoomi berates Sidharth for his suggestion and apologises to Meera and Muthuramalingam, but Muthuramalingam also insists Meera to leave with Bhoomi. Bhoomi, Meera and Sidharth leave together from the village. Just the before the train starts, Sidharth throws the diary containing the truth in a dust bin and comes back, but Bhoomi takes back the diary from the dust bin, without Sidharth's knowledge. Upon reading the diary, Bhoomi is shocked knowing it was Meera who loved him in the name of Ammukutty and  wholeheartedly accepts Meera.

Cast

Production

Development
The film was initially referred to as Kaavalkaaran, which literally means "bodyguard" in Tamil. After rumours of the title being changed to Kaaval Kaadhal, the film was officially confirmed to be titled Kaavalan in August 2010. The reason for the name confusion and its eventual permanent change was due to complications in obtaining the rights to the title of Kaavalkaaran from M. G. Ramachandran's producers. They refused to sell the title to Vijay, leading to the rechristening of the title to Kaavalan.

Casting
With the announcement of the remake, Siddique had finalised Vijay to play the lead role, reminiscent of their previous venture Friends (2001), which was also a remake of Siddique's own Malayalam film. Asin was signed up to pair with Vijay for the third time after their previous pairings in Sivakasi (2005) and Pokkiri (2007), also giving Asin a comeback in Tamil cinema after her last appearance in Dasavathaaram (2008). This also marks Vijay’s comeback to romance genre after 6 years; the last time he appeared in a romantic film was Sachein. Vadivelu, Rajkiran, and Roja Selvamani were also signed up as supporting characters.

Filming
The film's principal shoot began in April at Kumbakonam. An incident occurred on set in April, where Asin, her father, and her makeup assistants fainted in their caravan after being exposed to a gas leak. They were treated in hospital the same day and were eventually discharged. The second shoot schedule occurred in Vellore. Vijay and Asin, along with director Siddique and the rest of crew filmed at the Vellore Institute of Technology. A song was shot at Kuala Lumpur, Malaysia.

Soundtrack

Harris Jayaraj was approached to compose music for the film. However, he declined the offer citing a busy schedule. The score and soundtrack were then composed by Vidyasagar, collaborating with Vijay for the 8th time, after Coimbatore Mappillai, Nilaave Vaa, Thirumalai, Ghilli, Madhurey, Aathi and Kuruvi. The soundtrack consists of five tracks, with lyrics written by Yugabharathi, Pa. Vijay, Viveka and Kabilan. The audio launch was held on 8 December 2010.

Behindwoods gave the album a rating of 3/5, and stated that it is fresh and youthful. Sify gave the album, rating 4 out of 5, and stated "The album is youthful, and make sure it is an instant hit." MusicAloud.com rated the album 8 out of 10, stating "After a completely subdued soundtrack for Mandhira Punnagai, he creates another out-and-out commercial score in Kaavalan. A sureshot musical hit for Vijay!" Rediff rated the album 2.5 out of 5, stating that "Kaavalan would be a throwback to the star's earlier, romance-heavy movies, notably Friends. It looks like Vidhyasagar has followed the same mission directive. It's a relief to see less of hero-overtones and more soft numbers."

Marketing
The trailer was released worldwide on 16 December in Northern California, marking the first time a Vijay film trailer was launched outside India.

Controversies 
Due to the failure of Sura (2010), theatre owners faced huge losses, and asked Vijay to compensate 35% of the loss amount. However, Vijay did not give any response. A week before the film's release, Tamil Nadu Theatre Owners Association, had announced that they will not give any other co-operation to Kaavalan, and the actor's other future projects. As a result, two shows were cancelled on the opening day, 14 January 2011, and went ahead with matinee shows.

Moreover, it was rumoured that significant industry stakeholders from Dravida Munnetra Kazhagam pressurised exhibitors to stall the film's release, since Aadukalam, which was distributed by Sun Pictures, was slated to release in January 2011, and also majority of the theatres were controlled by the party supremos. In order to have a smooth release, Vijay sought help from J. Jayalalithaa, from All India Anna Dravida Munnetra Kazhagam, which was the opposition party at that time, as a result the film opened to 450 screens, on 15 January 2011.

Release
Originally slated to release on 17 December 2010, Kaavalan was released on 15 January 2011. The film was selected at the 14th Shanghai International Film Festival in the panorama section. SIFF issued an invitation to Vijay as guest of honour. The film was later dubbed in Hindi as Main Hoon Bodyguard. And It Was Dubbed In Bhojpuri As Hamar Angrakshak.

Kaavalan re-released in Kerala after ten years in 10th February 2022 to celebrate 10 years of its release.

Home Media
Initially, the satellite rights of the film was bought by Star Vijay, but later it was acquired by Sun TV.

Reception

Box office
Kaavalan released over 600 screens. Kaavalan released to generally positive reviews from critics. The film collected 6.5 crore in Chennai at its opening day. The film grossed 75,000 in the United Kingdom The movie managed to complete a 100-day run in 2 theatres in Tamil Nadu

Critical response
Behindwoods.com rated the film 4 out of 5 stars and called it "a relatable love story shot in a cute and simple manner, rich with emotions, and a smooth narration". The reporter noted good chemistry between Vijay and Asin. Asin's performance was described as convincing. Oneindia commented, "Vijay's performance as extraordinary and describing Kaavalan is a family entertainer with an extraordinary script".  Pavithra Srinivasan of Rediff.com praised Vadivelu and Vijay's comedic performances, but criticised the Tamil version of the film, for being edited in such a way that scenes either lacked resolution or coherence, and some character dialogue was delivered "without continuity". Ananda Vikatan rated the film 42 out of 100. A critic from Rediff.com, while giving the film 3.5 out of 5 stars, credited Vijay for "shedding his action/political persona" and "choosing a script that focuses on comedy and emotions".

The Times of India rated the film 3/5 and says "'Kaavalan' is vintage Vijay on display and is proof that if he keeps away from superhero mannerisms and sticks to the vision of the director". Sify.com described the film as "super fun" and a "perfect Pongal family entertainer" and rated it 4.5/5. The reviewer particularly praised Vijay's performance, observing that the film works "purely on his star charisma and larger-than-life image" and that "he carries the film on his shoulders and is one good reason to watch the film".

Accolades

References

External links
 
 

Indian romantic action films
2011 romantic comedy films
2011 films
Films about bodyguards
Films directed by Siddique
Films shot in Malaysia
Films scored by Vidyasagar
2010s Tamil-language films
Tamil remakes of Malayalam films
Films shot at Varikkasseri Mana
2010s romantic action films